Oxyloma haydeni is a species of small, air-breathing land snail, a terrestrial pulmonate gastropod mollusc in the family Succineidae, the amber snails. A subspecies of this species is protected after having been  recognized as Endangered.

Subspecies
 Oxyloma haydeni haydeni (W. G. Binney, 1858) - Niobrara ambersnail
 Oxyloma haydeni kanabensis (Pilsbry, 1948) - Kanab ambersnail an endangered subspecies

References

 US Fish & Wildlife Service info on the second subspecies

Succineidae
Gastropods described in 1858